Mifune: The Last Samurai, also known as Mifune, is a 2015 biographical documentary directed by Steven Okazaki. It chronicles the life of Toshiro Mifune, a Japanese actor and international star most noted for playing samurai characters in films by Akira Kurosawa.

Plot

Cast

 Toshiro Mifune (archival footage) as himself
 Akira Kurosawa (archival footage) as himself
 Kyōko Kagawa as herself
 Yoko Tsukasa as herself
 Yoshio Tsuchiya as himself
 Takeshi Kato as himself
 Kaoru Yachigusa as herself
 Yosuke Natsuki as himself
 Terumi Niki as herself
 Steven Spielberg as himself
 Martin Scorsese as himself
 Shiro Mifune as himself
 Hisao Kurosawa as himself
 Teruyo Nogami as herself
 Tadao Sato as himself
 Sadao Nakajima as himself
 Haruo Nakajima as himself
 Kanzo Uni as himself
 Wataru Akashi as himself
 Kōji Yakusho as himself
 Keanu Reeves as narrator

Production
Mifune was produced by Toshiaki Nakazawa, known for producing 13 Assassins and Sukiyaki Western Django.

Writing
Mifune is inspired by the book Samurai: Hyōden Mifune Toshirō (Samurai: A Biography of Mifune Toshirō) by Matsuda Michiko.

Filming

Release
Mifune officially opened on November 25, 2016 at the IFC Center in New York City, over a year after its premiere at the Venice Film Festival in September 2015.

Its opening coincided with Toshiro Mifune being honored with a posthumous star on the Hollywood Walk of Fame—the ceremony also featured a screening of the film.

Home media
On April 25, 2017, Netflix began streaming Mifune in the United States on the same day as its DVD release.

Reception
On the review aggregator website Rotten Tomatoes, the film holds an approval rating of 82% based on 34 reviews, with an average rating of 6.5/10.

On Metacritic, the film has a score of 64 out of 100, based on 14 critics, indicating "generally favorable reviews".

Awards and nominations
Venice Film Festival (2015)
 Nominated – Best Documentary on Cinema – Steven Okazaki
Hawaii International Film Festival (2016)
 Nominated – Documentary Feature – Steven Okazaki
Denver International Film Festival (2016)
 Nominated – Best Documentary – Steven Okazaki

References

External links
 

2015 films
Akira Kurosawa
Films directed by Steven Okazaki
Japanese epic films
Japanese documentary films
2010s Japanese-language films
Samurai films
Seven Samurai
Toho films
2015 documentary films
2015 martial arts films
2010s Japanese films